This is a list of museums in Apulia, Italy.

References 

Apulia